, also known as the Jōkyū Disturbance or the Jōkyū Rebellion, was fought in Japan between the forces of Retired Emperor Go-Toba and those of the Hōjō clan, regents of the Kamakura shogunate, whom the retired emperor was trying to overthrow.

The main battle was at Uji, just outside Kyōto; this was the third battle to be fought there in less than half a century. It took place in 1221, that is, the third year of the Jōkyū era.

Background

In the beginning of the 13th century, Emperor Go-Toba found his attempts at political maneuvers blocked by the Kamakura shogunate. Seeking independence, and the power he considered rightfully his as the ruler of Japan, Go-Toba gathered allies in 1221, and planned to effect an overthrow of the shogunate. These allies consisted primarily of members of the Taira clan, and other enemies of the Minamoto, the victors in the Genpei War, and clan of the shōguns.

Accounts of the first Imperial banner appear in this period, and the very first is said to have been one that Go-Toba gave to a general during this war.  Sun and moon images were embroidered or painted with gold or silver on a red brocade.

Provocation and attack
In the fifth lunar month of 1221, the Retired Emperor Go-Toba decided on lines of succession, without consulting the shogunate. He then invited a great number of potential allies from amongst the eastern warriors of Kyoto to a great festival, thus revealing the loyalties of those who rejected the invitation. One important officer revealed his loyalty to the shogunate by doing so, and was killed. Several days later, the Imperial Court declared Hōjō Yoshitoki, the regent and representative of the shogunate, to be an outlaw, and three days later the entirety of eastern Japan had officially risen in rebellion.

Hōjō Yoshitoki decided to launch an offensive against Go-Toba's forces in Kyoto, using much the same three-pronged strategy as was employed a few decades earlier. One came from the mountains, one from the north, and the third, commanded by Yoshitoki's son Yasutoki, approached via the Tōkaidō road.

These forces faced meager opposition on their way to the capital; the Imperial commanders were simply outfought. When Go-Toba heard of this string of defeats, he left the city for Mount Hiei, where he asked for aid from the sōhei, the warrior monks of Mount Hiei. They declined, citing weakness, and Go-Toba returned to Kyoto. The remnants of the Imperial army fought their final stand at the bridge over the river Uji, where the opening battle of the Genpei War had been fought 41 years earlier. Yasutoki's cavalry pushed through, scattering the Imperial forces, and pressed on to Kyoto.

The capital was taken by the Shogun's forces, and Go-Toba's rebellion was put to an end. Go-Toba was banished to the Oki Islands, from where he never returned. His sons were also banished, including Retired Emperor Tsuchimikado (to Tosa) and Retired Emperor Juntoku (to Sado), and the recently enthroned Emperor Chūkyō, the first son of Juntoku, was replaced with Emperor Go-Horikawa, a nephew of Go-Toba.

References

Further reading
 Ponsonby-Fane, Richard Arthur Brabazon. (1962).  Sovereign and Subject. Kyoto: Ponsonby Memorial Society.

See also
List of wars
Military history of Japan

1220s in Japan
1221 in Asia
Wars involving Japan
Rebellions in Japan
Conflicts in 1221
13th-century rebellions
Emperor Go-Toba
Japanese imperial history